The Anacortes Refinery is a petroleum refinery located about 70 miles north of Seattle on March Point (Puget Sound), just outside Anacortes, Washington. The refinery has operated in Anacortes since 1955, and has 425 full-time employees. It has a 120,000 barrels per day (bpd) capacity and is operated by Marathon Petroleum.

Production 
The refinery receives crude feedstock via the Trans Mountain pipeline from Canada, by rail from North Dakota and the central U.S., and by tanker from Alaska and foreign sources. Gasoline, jet and diesel fuel are the primary products, which are supplied to end users predominantly in Washington and Oregon. Other products include heavy fuel oils, liquefied petroleum gas, and asphalt. Secondary processing facilities include a fluid catalytic cracker, an alkylation unit, hydrotreating units and a naphtha reformer. Finished products are shipped through a third-party pipeline system that serves western Washington and Oregon.

Explosion 

On April 2, 2010, an explosion at the Anacortes refinery killed seven workers when a heat exchanger failed during startup after a maintenance operation.

See also 
 Shell Anacortes Refinery

References 

Oil refineries in Washington
1955 establishments in Washington (state)
Energy infrastructure completed in 1955
Buildings and structures in Skagit County, Washington
Anacortes, Washington